The Manchester School of Acting  is a drama school that provides training in film, television and theatre and operates in the Deansgate area of Manchester, United Kingdom established in 2000.

History
Manchester School of Acting was founded by the actor Mark Hudson  in 2000  he eventually moved into television producing for the BBC the school's follows an American approach to drama training consistent with that such as naturalism and others. The school offers acting courses focused towards Film, Television and Theatre.

Courses
Include:
 MSA Diploma in Acting
 MSA Advanced Diploma in Acting

Additional classes
Include.
 Accent Reduction
 Archetypes
 Audition technique (theatre)
 Audition technique (TV)
 Audition technique (film) 
 Dialect
 Movement and Posture
 Self-taping dialect
 Showreel preparation 
 The business of being an actor

Notable alumni 
Include:

See also
 Arden School of Theatre
 Manchester School of Theatre

References

External links
Manchester School of Acting website

Education in Manchester
Educational institutions established in 2000
Drama schools in the United Kingdom
2000 establishments in England